Consul Reef is a line of drying and submerged rocks forming the south end of the Dion Islands, off the south end of Adelaide Island. It was so named by the UK Antarctic Place-Names Committee in 1963; the name extends those in the neighboring islands associated with an emperor's court.

References
 

Reefs of Adelaide Island